Cloyd is a surname. Notable people with the surname include:

David Cloyd (born 1974), American singer-songwriter
Paul Cloyd (1920–2005), American basketball player
Timothy Cloyd, American educator and university administrator
Tyler Cloyd (born 1987), American baseball player

Fictional
Denis Cloyd, a character in The Walking Dead.
Dennis Cloyd, a mentioned character in The Walking Dead.